The Skatenigs are a punk industrial metal band from Texas which formed in the late 1980s.

History
The Skatenigs' lead singer, Phil "Phildo" Owen, previously performed on the album Beers, Steers, and Queers by the Revolting Cocks, and performed with the band on tour from 1989 to 1991. They released the single "Chemical Imbalance" in 1991 on Wax Trax! Records. Its B-side was a cover of the Big Boys song "Big Picture". Their debut album, Stupid People Shouldn't Breed, was released on Megaforce Records in 1992. It was produced by Ministry frontman Al Jourgensen, making the Skatenigs the first Texas band to attract Ministry's attention. Also in 1992, Owen produced Burning in Water, Drowning in Flame, the debut album by fellow Texans from Corpus Christi Skrew. Owen formed Choreboy along with Chris Gates of the Big Boys.

In 2011, Phil Owen reformed the band but this time recruiting Mike Scaccia of Ministry and Casey Orr of GWAR. The band would play a few outings that year and the following year. But it wasn't until 2016 when the band self-released Adult Entertainment For Kids that Owen would reform once again, this time with the current lineup of Myke Bingham, Adam Lamar and Chris Gates, with production cohort Chris Ahrens.

In 2020, the band released two albums compiling previously released material as Show Me Where They Touched You and Show Me Where They Touched You... Again.

Members

Past
 Ron Bretzky - Bass (9 string)
 Christopher Chambers - Guitar/Programming
 Jason "Megabyte" Cobb - Keyboards
 "Keefy Weefy" Dailey - Drums
 Mark Dufour - Drums/Programming
 Mike Dunn - Drums
 Ralph Ekakiadis- Keyboards
 Chip Fischer - Drums
 Chris Gates - Bass
 Billy Jackson-guitar
 Mat Mitchell - Guitar/Programming
 Don G. "DonG" Meyer - Mascot
 Jack Lightfoot - Bass
 Greg Main - Drums
 John Monte - Bass
 Wendy Nelson - Keyboards
 Phil "Phildo" Owen - Insults, Vocals, Production and Advertising
 Lance Von Moulder - Bass
 Steve “Bunghole” Schubert - Guitar (Unplugged)
 Clayton Wavering - Guitar
 Jason Wolford - Turntables/Programming

bold font = Original line-up

Guest appearances and cameos
 Al Jourgensen
 Jeff Ward
 Gibby Haynes
 Lee Ving
 Marstan Daly
 Charles Levi
 Paul Raven
 Satan’s cheerleaders

Additional studio help roster:
 Jeff “Dawg” Allen
 King George
 Joe Kelly
 Leslie Stewart
 Rosemary Walker
 Jacy Planta
 Fluffy
 Jody and Jill
 Caroline Schwartz
 Steve Shaw
 Palmer Earley
 Wax Trax staff
 Trax studio staff
 Digital Services Staff

Discography
Stupid People Shouldn't Breed (Megaforce, 1992)
What a Mangled Web We Leave (Red Light Records, 1994)
Adult Entertainment For Kids (Self-Released, 2016)
Show Me Where They Touched You (Self-Released, 2020)
Show Me Where They Touched You... Again (Self-Released, 2020)

References

Musical groups from Austin, Texas
1980s establishments in Texas
American industrial metal musical groups
Wax Trax! Records artists
Megaforce Records artists